Chester County G. O. Carlson Airport  is a public airport two miles (3 km) west of Coatesville, in Valley Township, Chester County, Pennsylvania. It is owned by the Chester County Area Airport Authority.

Chester County's airport identifier was 40N but it has recently changed to MQS. The airport is next to Keystone Heliport (closed)
. Signature Flight Support, a fixed-base operator, and flight training offered by Chester County Aviation, are also located on field.

Most U.S. airports use the same three-letter location identifier for the FAA and IATA, but Chester County Airport is MQS to the FAA and CTH to the IATA (which assigned MQS to Mustique Airport on Mustique island in Saint Vincent and the Grenadines.)

History
The airport opened May 1, 1928 as Coatesville Airport and was owned and operated by the City of Coatesville. In 1959 Chester County purchased the airport and took over operations. At this time, the Chester County Area Airport Authority was formed and the airport was renamed to Chester County Airport. In 1962 the airport was renamed in honor of the first Authority chairman, G. O. Carlson.

Facilities
In the year ending November 17, 2006 the airport had 52,000 aircraft operations, average 142 per day: 94% general aviation, 6% air taxi and <1% military. 96 aircraft are based at the airport: 62% single-engine, 17% multi-engine, 20% jet, and 1% helicopter.

Expansion
As part of the 12-year-plan for the airport, many projects are planned. A new apron is planned south of the current runway. New hangars will be built for corporate jets. The current runway will remain. A control tower is being discussed, if traffic increases.

References

External links

Chester County Area Airport Authority
JetDirect Aviation
The Flying Machine Cafe
Chester County Aviation
Keystone Helicopter
JetDirect Employee Site

Airports in Pennsylvania
County airports in Pennsylvania
Transportation buildings and structures in Chester County, Pennsylvania